General elections were held in Sweden on 18 September 1960. The Swedish Social Democratic Party remained the largest party, winning 114 of the 232 seats in the Andra kammaren of the Riksdag.

Results

References

General elections in Sweden
Sweden
General
Sweden